Kasumi Takahashi is a Japanese-Australian rhythmic gymnast who lives in Los Angeles, California, United States. She was born to an Australian mother and a Japanese father on 6 May 1980 in Tokyo, Japan.

She was an overnight success at the 1994 Commonwealth Games in Victoria, British Columbia, Canada, when she took out all five gold medals - ball, rope, clubs, ribbon and the all-around title - setting an Australian record. However, her ribbon victory attracted some protest from the Canadian crowd, many of whom would have liked to see home gymnast Camille Martens rewarded with gold.

Kasumi retired from the sport in 1998 after suffering stress fractures in her back. Although she competed for Australia, she trained at the California Academy of Rhythmic Gymnastics.

References

External links
Video Interview

1980 births
Living people
Australian rhythmic gymnasts
Australian people of Japanese descent
Commonwealth Games gold medallists for Australia
Sportspeople from Tokyo
Gymnasts from Los Angeles
Gymnasts at the 1994 Commonwealth Games
American sportswomen
Commonwealth Games silver medallists for Australia
Commonwealth Games medallists in gymnastics
21st-century American women
Medallists at the 1994 Commonwealth Games